Jason Richardson (born April 4, 1986) is an American track and field athlete who specializes in the 110 meter hurdles. He won the gold medal in the 110 meter hurdles at the 2011 World Championships in Daegu, and the silver medal in the same event at the 2012 Summer Olympics in London. His personal best for the event is 12.98 seconds, set in June 2012 at the U.S. Olympic Trials.

Background
Growing up in Cedar Hill, Texas, a suburb of Dallas, he began taking part in sports at the age of 12. Despite having a talent for hurdling, his parents were initially hesitant in encouraging him to compete in track and field. For Richardson and his family, the focus was his education: having represented his school at a national level on their debate team, he saw the discipline more as a way of pursuing further academic study via a college scholarship. By the time he graduated from Cedar Hill High School, he had run the third fastest ever time in the 400 meter hurdles for a high school athlete.

Career
In his first international outing at the 2003 World Youth Championships in Athletics, he completed a novel 110 m and 400 m hurdles double, taking both gold medals in personal record times. He became the first person ever to win a hurdles double at a major athletics championship and earned him that year's Youth Athlete of the Year award from USA Track and Field.

In 2005, he obtained a McKissick Scholarship and enrolled at the University of South Carolina to study sport and entertainment management. He began to focus more on short-sprint hurdling and ran for the South Carolina Gamecocks, taking NCAA bronze medals indoors and outdoors in his first year at the college. Injury affected his 2006 indoor season and he failed to finish at the NCAA Indoor Championship after falling at the second hurdle. He was runner-up in both hurdles competitions at the SEC Championships outdoors, and then went on to another third-place finish in the 110 m NCAA contest. He did not make the NCAA 400 m hurdles final, despite running a time of 49.82 seconds in the semi-finals. He closed the year with a silver medal over 110 m hurdles at the NACAC U-23 Championships.

Richardson focused on his studies in 2007 as an injury ruled him out of the track season. His final year at South Carolina (2008) proved to be his most successful. In the 60 meter hurdles indoors, he was runner-up at the Millrose Games, Tyson Invitational and the SEC Indoors. He was also the silver medalist at the NCAA Indoor Championship, where he ran a personal best of 7.53 seconds, but lost by a fraction of a second in a photo finish. In the outdoor season, he won the SEC Championship title in the 110 m hurdles and ran a personal best of 13.21 seconds to claim the NCAA Regional title. A win at the NCAA Outdoors brought him a SEC/NCAA Regional/NCAA hat-trick. He was named South Carolina's MVP both outdoors and indoors that year and he was also chosen at the USTFCCCA Scholar Athlete of the Year. Following a win at the NACAC Under-23 Championships in championship record time, he went on to compete at the United States Olympic Trials, although a hamstring injury in the qualifiers ruled out his selection chances.

He turned professional for the 2009 season and focused solely on the 110 m hurdles; his best run of the year (13.29 sec) came in Gainesville, Florida. He ran on the IAAF Diamond League circuit in Europe the next year, but came last in the 110 m hurdles final at the 2010 USA Outdoor Track and Field Championships. He twice ran a personal record time of 13.15 seconds at the 2011 USA Championships and was rewarded with third place behind David Oliver and Aries Merritt, gaining his first senior international selection in the process. During the 2011 IAAF Diamond League season, he won at the DN Galan and came second to Dayron Robles at the London Grand Prix with a personal record run of 13.08 seconds. He is coached by John Smith, who also trains Carmelita Jeter and previously coached Maurice Greene.

On August 29, 2011, Richardson ran 13.16 to win the 110 meter hurdles World Championship in Daegu, South Korea, after Robles (the initial winner) was disqualified for impeding Liu Xiang. On August 8, 2012, Richardson won the silver in the 110 meter hurdles at the 2012 Summer Olympics in London. In August 2013, Richardson finished 4th in 2013 World Championships in Athletics – Men's 110 metres hurdles.

Achievements

References

External links

 
 

Living people
1986 births
American male hurdlers
Track and field athletes from Houston
South Carolina Gamecocks men's track and field athletes
Athletes (track and field) at the 2012 Summer Olympics
Olympic silver medalists for the United States in track and field
World Athletics Championships medalists
Medalists at the 2012 Summer Olympics
People from Cedar Hill, Texas
World Athletics Championships winners